Worcester Bosch (commonly referred to as Worcester) is a United Kingdom based heating and hot water products manufacturer.

The company was founded in 1962 by Cecil Duckworth as Worcester Engineering Co Ltd in Worcester, England. After changing its name to Worcester Heat Systems Ltd, in 1992 the company was acquired by Robert Bosch GmbH, adopting the new name of Worcester Bosch.

Headquartered in Warndon, the company employs more than 2,000 people across the headquarters and manufacturing plants in Worcester and Clay Cross, Derbyshire, including a network of over 300 service engineers and over 80 technically trained field sales managers.

History
The company was founded by Cecil Duckworth in 1962 as Worcester Engineering Co Ltd, based at the Old Vinegar works in Worcester. Worcester's early success is attributed to the pioneering of combination boilers in the UK, further successful performance in the UK heating market led to the expansion and relocation of the factory to its current headquarters in Warndon in 1990.

Continued growth was followed by the acquisition by Robert Bosch GmbH in 1992, with the company changing its name to 'Worcester, Bosch Group'. As part of Bosch's heating technology subsidiary, Worcester is a brand of Bosch Thermotechnology Ltd, the collective name that refers to Worcester, Bosch Group and Buderus (acquired by Bosch in 2003).

Whilst Worcester's origins lie in oil and gas boilers, recent years have seen the company champion renewable technologies such as solar water heating, ground source and air source heat pumps. The company runs schemes such as the Environment 2020 awards to reward and promote energy efficiency and reinforce their commitment to being an "environmentally responsible manufacturer".

Worcester has been awarded the royal warrant by the Queen for supplying hot water products to the royal family.

Worcester Bosch Group were a founding sponsor of the Upton Blues Festival, but in 2009 reluctantly pulled out.

Worcester have recently teamed up with the Scout Association to sponsor their cub scout Global Challenge badge which helps children to understand the complexities of energy conservation throughout the world.

The Company and their products have also been independently recognised by the UK's largest consumer body, Which?, who awarded 'Best Buy' awards in 2010, 2011, 2012 and 2014 to products in Worcester's Gas range. The summary of the 2014 Which? Boiler Report stated "Worcester continues to be the best gas-fired boiler brand. Its customers are the happiest of any brand's customers in our survey, with a great customer score of 89%. Its boilers also stand the best chance of remaining fault free, compared with the 12 rival gas boiler brands included in our survey."

The company has strong connections to the Worcester Warriors Rugby club through Chairman and founder Cecil Duckworth CBE, and that was renewed in 2010 when Worcester, Bosch Group was named as the Warriors new shirt sponsor up to the 2012-13 season.

Product portfolio
Worcester's product portfolio covers seven technologies:

 Boilers fired by natural gas, heating oil and liquefied petroleum gas
 Solar water heating
 Geothermal heat pumps
 Air to air heat pumps
 Air to water heat pumps

Worcester's gas, oil and LPG ranges consist of high efficiency regular boilers, combination boilers and system boilers; these are wall-hung, floor-standing or externally sited.

Worcester's solar water heating range was released in 2005, with the ground source heat pump range being released in 2007 and the air source heat pump range being released in 2008.

Installation 
Worcester operates a loyalty scheme known as the Worcester Accredited Installer scheme. Worcester Accredited Installers "specialise in Worcester products and can offer extended warranties" and benefit from features such as the online 'Find an Installer' search. Worcester Accredited Installers are experienced in fitting Worcester products but are not employed by Worcester. Worcester specifies that all members of the Worcester Accredited Installer scheme are Gas Safe Registered.

Environment 2020
Another notable scheme from Worcester is the Environment 2020 awards, which are "intended to celebrate and promote activities dedicated to conserving the environment for future generations." These consist of a children's art competition, a self-build competition and an installation competition. Once a year the company holds an awards day at Worcester's headquarters in Warndon to present the annual winners with their awards.

Relocation plans
It has been announced in the local and national press that the company has applied for planning permission to relocate its Warndon headquarters to a new site near junction 6 of the M5. This land is part of the Green Belt.

An interview with Paul Middlebrough, leader of the Wychavon District Council in the Worcester News provided some support for the proposed move; "Strategically, Wychavon recognises the absolute necessity to retain Bosch and formulate its expansion in the Worcester area. In this difficult and probably deteriorating time, the fact that Bosch are going to expand is good for everybody. The proposal will provide opportunities for more employees to move into a prime location, which places us in a good position to promote jobs for local people as the economy recovers."

Data breach
In May 2018, a serious data breach inadvertently revealed the home addresses of “tens of thousands” of Worcester customers.

References

British Royal Warrant holders
Heating, ventilation, and air conditioning companies
Home appliance brands
Home appliance manufacturers of the United Kingdom
Manufacturing companies established in 1962
Manufacturing companies based in Worcester, England
Natural gas companies of the United Kingdom
North East Derbyshire District
Robert Bosch GmbH
1962 establishments in England
1992 mergers and acquisitions